The Coombsville AVA is an American Viticultural Area located within the Napa Valley AVA just east of the city of Napa.  The appellation varies from near sea level at the Napa River on the west to 1,900 feet at the ridge of the Vaca Mountain Range.  Proximity to San Pablo Bay contributes to the temperate climate of Coombsville. Cooling effects of marine air and fog occur almost daily during the growing season, arriving earlier and lingering longer than in the more northern regions of Napa Valley. Temperatures are less extreme during the winter frost season.  The Coombsville soils are dominated by the volcanic rhyolitic tuff sedimentary rock and lava flows of the Vaca Range on the eastern side of the Napa Valley. Located in the wide alluvial deposits created by the wearing down of the hillsides, the Coombsville soils contain abundant rock, gravel and, in some areas, are layered with volcanic ash deposits from Mount George. The appellation was officially designated the 16th sub-appellation of the Napa Valley AVA on December 14, 2011.

References

External links
 Official Site

American Viticultural Areas of the San Francisco Bay Area
Napa Valley
Vaca Mountains
Geography of Napa County, California
2011 establishments in California
American Viticultural Areas